John Sydney Hiddleston (10 December 1890 – 30 October 1940) was a cricketer who played for Otago, Wellington and New Zealand, from 1909-10 to 1928-29, in the years before New Zealand played Test cricket.

Cricket career
An all-rounder who could bat at any position in the order and bowled medium pace and leg-spin, Hiddleston played three matches for Otago in 1909-10 before moving to Wellington, for whom he played his first first-class game in 1913-14. In his second game for Wellington he opened the batting in the first innings with Clarrie Grimmett; Hiddleston made 64 of their opening partnership of 78.

He played for New Zealand in the two international matches against Australia in 1921, one match against the MCC in 1922-23, two matches against the touring New South Wales team in 1923-24, and another two against Victoria in 1924-25. However, his performances in these matches were moderate: 270 runs at 19.28 and only one wicket.

His best performances came in the Plunket Shield. In the three-match competition in 1923-24 he scored 163, 46, 94, 34, 18 and 150, becoming the first player to hit 500 runs in a season. He broke the record again in 1925-26, scoring 212 (against Canterbury; his highest score), 73, 14, 34 and 204; his 537 runs in a season remained the record for more than 20 years. Wellington won the Shield in both of his record-breaking seasons.

He scored his 212 against Canterbury in 260 minutes. He opened the batting on the first day, was 103 not out at lunch, and was fourth out not long after tea with the score at 343, on a day in which Wellington scored 494 for 9 wickets off 94 eight-ball overs. So he is likely to have scored at a little under a run a ball. His 204 a few weeks later was probably a little slower, but no less impressive: he came to the wicket at 18 for 1, reached his double-century in 262 minutes, and was last out in a team total of 374 off 85.1 overs.

His best bowling performances came in two consecutive matches, both against Canterbury in 1918-19, when he took 8 for 59 (on Christmas Day) and 2 for 82 then 5 for 75 and 2 for 78 when the two sides met again the next month for bowling figures in the two matches of 95.1-10-294-17.

He won the Redpath Cup for batsman of the season in 1921-22 and 1923-24. Dick Brittenden said, "He was a thoughtful batsman, conscious of the problems of his trade; it was simply that he seemed able to resolve them more swiftly and efficiently than anyone else."

Hiddleston was one of the 11 players chosen in 1936 by the New Zealand cricket historian Tom Reese as the best New Zealand team of all time. When Tom Lowry was president of the New Zealand Cricket Council he made a speech in 1952 in which he declared that Hiddleston was one of New Zealand's "five greatest cricketers", along with Dan Reese, Martin Donnelly, Bert Sutcliffe and Jack Cowie.

Personal life
He worked as an indent agent in soft goods. His business commitments sometimes curtailed his cricket, preventing his participation in New Zealand's tours to Australia in 1925-26 and England in 1927.

He and his wife Rosina had one daughter. He died after a hernia operation.

See also
 List of Otago representative cricketers

References

External links
 
 

1890 births
1940 deaths
Wellington cricketers
New Zealand cricketers
Pre-1930 New Zealand representative cricketers
Otago cricketers
Cricketers from Invercargill
North Island cricketers